The 2021–22 Stanford Cardinal women's basketball team represented Stanford University during the 2021–22 NCAA Division I women's basketball season. The Cardinal were led by thirty-sixth year head coach Tara VanDerveer, and they played their home games at Maples Pavilion as members of the Pac-12 Conference. They entered this season as the defending NCAA champions.

Roster

Schedule

|-
!colspan=12 style=| Exhibition

|-
!colspan=12 style=| Regular season

|-
!colspan=12 style=| Pac-12 Women's Tournament

|-
!colspan=12 style=| NCAA tournament

Source:

Rankings

*The preseason and week 1 polls were the same.^Coaches poll was not released for Week 2.

Notes

References

Stanford Cardinal women's basketball seasons
Stanford
2021 in sports in California
2022 in sports in California
Stanford
NCAA Division I women's basketball tournament Final Four seasons